Hersilia (minor planet designation: 206 Hersilia) is a fairly large Main belt asteroid. It was discovered by C. H. F. Peters on October 13, 1879, in Clinton, New York. The asteroid was named after Hersilia, Roman wife of Romulus. It is classified as a primitive, dark carbon-rich C-type asteroid.

Measurements made with the IRAS observatory give a diameter of 101.72 ± 5.18 km and a geometric albedo of 0.06 ± 0.01. By comparison, the MIPS photometer on the Spitzer Space Telescope gives a diameter of 97.99 ± 7.40 km and a geometric albedo of 0.06 ± 0.02.

The last close earth transit was in November and December 2002.

References

External links 
 The Asteroid Orbital Elements Database
 Asteroid Lightcurve Parameters
 Asteroid Albedo Compilation
 
 

Background asteroids
Hersilia
Hersilia
C-type asteroids (Tholen)
C-type asteroids (SMASS)
18791013